
The following lists events that happened during 1802 in South Africa.

Events
 A fragile Peace of Amiens is concluded between England and France

Deaths
 8 August – Field Commandant Tjaart van der Walt is killed in a skirmish against the Xhosa and Khoi-Khoi in the Kouga Mountains

References
See Years in South Africa for list of References

History of South Africa